Mingala is a sub-prefecture and town in the Basse-Kotto Prefecture of the southern Central African Republic.

History 
On 19 May 2019 rebels from Union for Peace in the Central African Republic seized gold mine near Mingala town. On 10 January 2020 UPC rebels took control of several villages (Kollo, Kaboul 3, Zounguinza i Drochengba and Morouba) near Mingala. On 18 September 2021 heavy clashes erupted in Mingala between UPC rebels and Russian mercenaries. As of January 2022 Mingala remains under UPC control.

References 

Sub-prefectures of the Central African Republic
Populated places in Basse-Kotto